The Men's 12.5 kilometre biathlon pursuit competition at the 2006 Winter Olympics in Turin, Italy was held on 18 February, at Cesana San Sicario. Competitors raced over five loops of a 2.5 kilometre skiing course, shooting twenty times, ten prone and ten standing. Each miss required a competitor to ski a 150-metre penalty loop.

The starting order for the pursuit was based on the results of the sprint; the top 60 finishers in that race qualified for the pursuit. In addition, each racer's final deficit behind sprint winner Sven Fischer corresponded to their starting deficit in the pursuit; Halvard Hanevold, who finished 8 seconds behind Fischer in the sprint, started 8 seconds after him in the pursuit. The winner was the first racer over the finish line, Vincent Defrasne.

Ole Einar Bjørndalen was the defending World and Olympic champion in this event, but was ranked fourth in the World Cup standings before the Games, behind Germany's Michael Rösch, Frenchman Raphaël Poirée and another German, Sven Fischer.

Results 

Two Austrian athletes were disqualified after the IOC determined they had violated the Anti-Doping rules; Wolfgang Rottmann had originally placed 21st, while Wolfgang Perner had placed 25th.

The race was held at 14:30.

References

Men's biathlon at the 2006 Winter Olympics
2006 Winter Olympics